was a Japanese film director and screenwriter. Known for his "broad range and innovative filmmaking," Fukasaku worked in many different genres and styles, but was best known for his gritty yakuza films, typified by the Battles Without Honor and Humanity series (1973–1976). According to the Berkeley Art Museum and Pacific Film Archive, "his turbulent energy and at times extreme violence express a cynical critique of social conditions and genuine sympathy for those left out of Japan's postwar prosperity." He used a cinema verite-inspired shaky camera technique in many of his films from the early 1970s.

Fukasaku wrote and directed over 60 films between 1961 and 2003. Some Western sources have associated him with the Japanese New Wave movement of the '60s and '70s, but this belies his commercial success. His works include the Japanese portion of the Hollywood war film Tora! Tora! Tora! (1970), jidaigeki such as Shogun's Samurai (1978), the space opera Message from Space (1978), the post-apocalyptic science fiction film Virus (1980), the fantasy film Samurai Reincarnation (1981), and the influential dystopian thriller Battle Royale (2000).

Fukasaku won the Japan Academy Film Prize for Director of the Year three times, out of nine total nominations. He served as President of the Directors Guild of Japan from 1996, until his death from prostate cancer in 2003. In 1997, he received the Purple Medal of Honor from the Japanese government for his work in film. His films have inspired directors such as Quentin Tarantino, William Friedkin, and John Woo.

Early life
Kinji Fukasaku was born in 1930 in Mito, Ibaraki Prefecture as the youngest of five children. When he was 15 years old, Fukasaku's class was drafted, and he worked as a munitions worker during World War II. In July 1945, the class was caught in bombing. Since the children could not escape the bombs, they had to dive under each other in order to survive. The surviving members of the class had to dispose of the corpses. After the war, he spent much of his time watching foreign films.

Career
Fukasaku studied cinema at Nihon University, in the country's first film department, before switching to the literature department for scriptwriting his junior year. There he studied under Kogo Noda and Katsuhito Inomata. After graduating in 1953, Fukasaku became an assistant director at Toei in June 1954, where he worked under people such as Masahiro Makino and Yasushi Sasaki.

Fukasaku made his directorial debut in 1961 with the two featurettes Drifting Detective: Tragedy in the Red Valley and Drifting Detective: Black Wind in the Harbor, starring Sonny Chiba. His first feature-length film for the New Toei subsidiary was High Noon for Gangsters that same year. His first film produced in color was Gang vs. G-Men (1962). His first film for the Toei Company proper was The Proud Challenge the following year starring Kōji Tsuruta. He had his breakthrough hit in 1964 with Ken Takakura starring in Jakoman and Tetsu. From 1966 to 1971, he created several modern gang films for Toei usually starring Tsuruta, such as Kaisanshiki (1967), Bakuto Kaisanshiki (1968) and Japan Organized Crime Boss (1969).

Thanks to a non-exclusive contract, he also directed Black Lizard, based on Yukio Mishima's stage adaptation of the Edogawa Rampo novel, and Black Rose Mansion for Shochiku both of which starred the transvestite actor Akihiro Miwa. In 1968 he directed The Green Slime, a United States-Japan science fiction co-production.

In 1970, Fukasaku was recruited to direct the Japanese portion of another US-Japan film, Tora! Tora! Tora!, after Akira Kurosawa pulled out. Using his pay from the project, he bought the rights to adapt Under the Flag of the Rising Sun. The movie was critically acclaimed, even being selected as Japan's entry for Best Foreign Language Film at the 45th Academy Awards in 1972, although it was not accepted as a nominee. That year also saw the release of Street Mobster starring Bunta Sugawara, which resulted in Toei producer Koji Shundo selecting Fukasaku to direct a groundbreaking yakuza film. Battles Without Honor and Humanity was released in 1973. Up to this point, Japan's many yakuza films had usually been tales of chivalry set in the pre-war period, but Fukasaku's ultra-violent, documentary-style film took place in chaotic post-War Hiroshima. A commercial and critical success, it gave rise to seven sequels by Fukasaku and three movies that are based on the series but directed by others. After directing several more yakuza films, Graveyard of Honor (1975), Cops vs. Thugs (1975), Yakuza Graveyard (1976), and Hokuriku Proxy War (1977), Fukasaku left the genre.

He focused on historical epics; Shogun's Samurai (1978), The Fall of Ako Castle (1978), Samurai Reincarnation (1981); and science fiction; Message from Space (1978) and Virus (1980). Virus was Japan's most expensive production at the time, and became a financial flop. However, two years later he directed the acclaimed comedy Fall Guy, which won both the Japan Academy Prize for Picture of the Year and Kinema Junpo Award for Best Film of the Year. Fukasaku was chosen to direct Violent Cop (1989), but a scheduling conflict caused him to pull out and Takeshi Kitano took over in his first directorial role.

In 2000, Battle Royale was released. The film received positive critical praise and became a major financial success, grossing ¥3.11 billion domestically. It became a cultural phenomenon, creating the battle royale genre, a fictional narrative genre and/or mode of entertainment in which a select group of people are instructed to kill each off until there is a triumphant survivor. Near the end of his life, Fukasaku branched out into the world of video games by serving as the director of the Capcom/Sunsoft survival horror game Clock Tower 3 (2002).

Fukasaku announced he had prostate cancer in September 2002. In late December 2002, shortly after filming began on Battle Royale II: Requiem, he was hospitalized when his condition worsened. Fukasaku died at a Tokyo hospital on 12 January 2003, aged 72. Having directed only a single scene, his son, Kenta took over the film.

Filmography

Episodes of television series 
Key Hunter (1968) - Episodes 1 and 2
Hissatsu Shikakenin (1972) - Episodes 1, 2, and 24
G-Men '75 (1975-1979) - Episodes 16, 20, 85, and 354
The Yagyu Conspiracy (1978) - Episode 1
Shadow Warriors (1981) - Season 2, Episode 1

Video game 
Clock Tower 3 (2002)

Awards
1974 Kinema Junpo Reader's Choice Award for Best Film - Battles Without Honor and Humanity
1976 Blue Ribbon Award for Best Director - Graveyard of Honor, Cops vs. Thugs
1982 Hochi Film Award for Best Film - Fall Guy
1983 Japan Academy Prize for Director of the Year - Fall Guy, Dotonbori River
1983 Japan Academy Prize for Picture of the Year - Fall Guy
1983 Blue Ribbon Award for Best Film - Fall Guy
1983 Blue Ribbon Award for Best Director - Fall Guy
1983 Mainichi Film Award for Best film - Fall Guy
1983 Mainichi Film Award for Best Director - Fall Guy
1983 Mainichi Film Award Reader's Choice Award - Fall Guy
1983 Kinema Junpo Reader's Choice Award for Best Film - Fall Guy
1983 Kinema Junpo Reader's Choice Award for Best Director - Fall Guy
1983 Kinema Junpo Reader's Choice Award for Best Film - Fall Guy
1985 Japan Academy Prize for Director of the Year - Legend of the Eight Samurai, Shanghai Rhapsody
1987 Japan Academy Prize for Director of the Year - House on Fire
1987 Japan Academy Prize for Picture of the Year - House on Fire
1987 Kinema Junpo Reader's Choice Award for Best Film - House on Fire
1993 Yokohama Film Festival Special Prize - career
1994 Nikkan Sports Film Award for Best Director - Crest of Betrayal
1995 Japan Academy Prize for Director of the Year - Crest of Betrayal
1995 Japan Academy Prize for Picture of the Year - Crest of Betrayal
1999 Nikkan Sports Film Award for Best Director - The Geisha House
2001 Japan Academy Prize Popularity Award - Battle Royale
2001 Japan Academy Prize for Director of the Year (Nomination) - Battle Royale
2001 Japan Academy Prize for Picture of the Year (Nomination) - Battle Royale
2001 Blue Ribbon Award for Best Film - Battle Royale
2001 Sitges Film Festival for Best Film (Nomination) - Battle Royale
2001 San Sebastián Horror & Fantasy Film Festival Audience Award for Best Feature Film - Battle Royale
2003 Japan Academy Prize Special Award - career
2003 Blue Ribbon Award Special Award - career
2004 Mainichi Film Award Special Award - career

References

Further reading

External links

 
 
 Interview with Kinji Fukasaku at Midnight Eye

1930 births
2003 deaths
Deaths from prostate cancer
People from Mito, Ibaraki
Japanese film directors
Samurai film directors
Yakuza film directors
Science fiction film directors
Japan Academy Prize for Director of the Year winners
Deaths from cancer in Japan
Nihon University alumni
Recipients of the Medal with Purple Ribbon